Gronau is a former Samtgemeinde ("collective municipality") in the district of Hildesheim, in Lower Saxony, Germany. Its seat was in the town Gronau. On 1 November 2016 it was merged into the new Samtgemeinde Leinebergland.

The Samtgemeinde Gronau consisted of the following municipalities:

 Banteln 
 Betheln 
 Brüggen 
 Despetal 
 Eime
 Gronau
 Rheden 

Former Samtgemeinden in Lower Saxony